Alcan was a Canadian mining company and aluminum manufacturer.

Alcan may also refer to:

 Alcan Highway, or Alaska Highyway, a highway linking Alaska and Canada
 Alcan–Beaver Creek Border Crossing, a border crossing on the Alaska Highway
 Eugène Alcan (1811-c. 1898), a French writer
 Rio Tinto Alcan, the present incarnation of the Alcan company

See also
 Alcon (disambiguation)